John Ewart (14 February 1891 – 22 June 1943) was a Scottish footballer who made over 280 appearances in the Football League for Bradford City as a goalkeeper. He also played in the Scottish League for Airdrieonians in two spells and won one cap for Scotland at international level. The SFA described him as "a goalkeeper who helped to perpetuate the myth of eccentricity required for the position".

Career 
A goalkeeper, Ewart was born in Midlothian and raised in Bellshill; he began his career with a number of junior clubs in Lanarkshire, before joining Scottish League First Division club Airdrieonians in March 1909. He moved to England to join First Division club Bradford City in May 1912 for £1,200, a then-record fee for a goalkeeper. Either side of the First World War, Ewart made 302 appearances for the club, before returning Airdrieonians for a £300 fee in July 1923. In May 1927, Ewart returned to Bradford City, newly-relegated to the Third Division North, for a second spell, but lasted one season before seeing out his career with Second Division club Preston North End and retiring in 1931. Shortly after his retirement, Ewart was suspended from football sine die by the FA for an alleged match fixing incident.

At representative level, Ewart made two appearances for the Scottish League XI in 1910 and 1911. He won a single full cap for Scotland in a 3–0 1920–21 British Home Championship win over England on 9 April 1921. After retiring from football, Ewart returned to the game as a trainer.

Personal life 
Ewart spoke French and German and was a skilled flute, piccolo and violin player. He served as a private during the First World War, firstly in the West Yorkshire Regiment and latterly in the Training Reserve. Ewart was a publican later in life.

References

External links 
 

1891 births
1943 deaths
Association football goalkeepers
Scottish Football League players
Scottish footballers
Scotland international footballers
English Football League players
Airdrieonians F.C. (1878) players
Bradford City A.F.C. players
Preston North End F.C. players
Larkhall Thistle F.C. players
Scottish Football League representative players
Bellshill Athletic F.C. players
Footballers from Bellshill
Sportspeople from Midlothian
Scottish Junior Football Association players
People from Loanhead
British Army personnel of World War I
West Yorkshire Regiment soldiers